Skyline Acres is a census-designated place (CDP) in Colerain and Springfield townships, Hamilton County, Ohio, United States. The population was 1,446 at the 2020 census.

Geography
It is bordered by Mount Healthy to the east, North College Hill to the southeast, White Oak to the southwest, Groesbeck to the west, and Northbrook to the north. Ohio State Route 126, the Ronald Reagan Cross County Highway, runs through the southern part of the CDP.

Demographics

References

Census-designated places in Hamilton County, Ohio
Census-designated places in Ohio